Midhurst & Easebourne Football Club is a football club based in Midhurst, West Sussex, England.

History
The club was established in 1946 by a merger of Midhurst, whose ground had been used to build a school on, and Easebourne, who had lost several officials and players during the World War II. They joined the West Sussex League and went on to win the league in 1955–56, 1962–63 and 1964–65, as well as the Malcolm Simmonds Memorial Cup in 1959–60. After the top division was renamed the Premier Division, the club won the league again in 1967–68, the Bareham Cup in 1970–71 and the Malcolm Simmonds Memorial Cup in 1973–74. They won the Premier Division and Malcolm Simmonds Memorial Cup double in 1976–77 and retained the cup the following season, before winning another league and cup double in 1979–80, Although an application to join the Sussex County League was rejected in 1980, they were accepted into the league the following year, becoming members of Division Two.

In their first season in Division Two, Midhurst & Easebourne were runners-up, earning promotion to Division One. The club finished bottom of Division One in 1986–87 and were relegated back to Division Two. They won the Division Two Cup in 1988–89, beating Newhaven 5–3 on penalties in a replay. The club returned to Division One after finishing second in 1991–92, but were relegated back to Division Two at the end of the following season. A second successive relegation in 1993–94 saw them drop into Division Three. Although they won Division Three at the first attempt, the club were relegated back to the division at the end of the 1997–98 season.

In 1998–99 Midhurst & Easebourne finished bottom of Division Three and were relegated to the Premier Division of the West Sussex League. They were Premier Division champions and Centenary Cup winners in 2001–02 and were promoted back to Division Three of the Sussex County League. The following season saw them win the Division Three title and the Division Three Cup, earning promotion to Division Two. Although they finished bottom of Division Two in 2009–10, the club avoided being relegated to Division Three. In 2015 the Sussex County League was renamed the Southern Combination, with Division Two becoming Division One.

Staff
First Team Manager: Andrew Ewen
First Team Assistant Manager: Daniel Trussler
First Team Coach: Arnold Miron
Reserve Team Manager: Daniel Nash
Reserve Team Assistant Manager: Max Powell
Head Sports Therapist: Jodie Rushin
Sports Therapist: Lewis Sandy

Ground
After their foundation, the club played at The Rotherfield on Dodsley Road, the former ground of Easebourne. The ground is shared with a cricket club, with spectator facilities including a clubhouse and wooden stand with bench seating.

Honours
Southern Combination
Division Three champions 1994–95, 2002–03
Division Two Cup winners 1988–89
Division Three Cup winners 2002–03
West Sussex League
Champions 1955–56, 1962–63, 1964–65, 1967–68, 1976–77, 1979–80
Centenary Cup winners 2001-02
Malcolm Simmonds Memorial Cup winners 1959–60, 1973–74, 1976–77, 1977–78, 1979–80
Bareham Trophy winners 1970–71

References

External links
Official website

Football clubs in England
Football clubs in West Sussex
Association football clubs established in 1946
1946 establishments in England
Chichester District
West Sussex Football League
Southern Combination Football League